Viviana Águeda Gibelli Gómez (born 22 December 1965) is a Venezuelan TV show host, actress, and ex-beauty queen. She was a participant in the beauty pageant miss Venezuela in 1987 obtaining the position of second finalist, she represented Venezuela in the contest: Miss Wonderland 1987 where she was crowned queen of the American continent.

Biography 
Gibelli's father is of Brazilian-Italian descent while her mother is of Cuban origin. Gibelli has two brothers and has confessed that she prefers male friendships over female since she grew up playing with her brothers.

In 1987, Gibelli represented Monagas state in the Miss Venezuela national beauty pageant and finished as fourth runner-up. She then started a career as a fashion model.

Gibelli later participated in different types of television shows, beginning with Complicidades, a daytime magazine show geared towards women. Later on, she worked on children's shows and telenovelas. In 2003, Gibelli also filmed several television shows in Costa Rica.

Gibelli has participated in a total of five telenovelas, of which Gata Salvaje (Wild Cat), filmed in 2002, is the only one released internationally. She had big hits in Venezuela with El Pais de las Mujeres (The Country of Women) and Kaina, in which she both played one of the lead female roles. She has also participated in one Venezuelan feature film.

Gibelli is now a fixture of the Venevisión network where she had a talk show called Viviana a la Media Noche (Viviana at Midnight), as well as the Venezuelan television mega-hit La Guerra de Los Sexos (Battle of the Sexes).

Filmography

Stage 
El Método Grönholm, Caracas, Venezuela, 15 July to 15 November 2005
El Mundo De Oz, Caracas, Venezuela
La Bella Durmiente y El Príncipe Valiente, Caracas, Venezuela
Hercules, Caracas, Venezuela
Hasta Que El Matrimonio Nos Separe, Caracas, Venezuela

Telenovelas 
 Arroz con leche, 2007, Venezuela – Ella misma
 Gata Salvaje, 2002–2003, United States, Venezuela – Jacqueline Tovar
 El País de las mujeres, 1998–1999, Venezuela – Pamela Fuentes Gomez
 Pecado de amor, 1996, Venezuela – Esperanza Hernandez
 Ka Ina, 1995, Venezuela – Catalina Miranda
 Por Amarte Tanto, 1992, Venezuela – Laura Velásquez

Movies 
Baño de Damas, 2003 – Cloe

Series 
Qué Chicas, 1990–1991, Venezuela

Television programs 
Confidencias con Viviana Gibelli, 2011, Venezuela – host
Miss Venezuela, 2010 and 2013 – host
Confidencias con... (Segunda Etapa), 2004, Venezuela
Súper Sábado Sensacional, 2001–2006, Venezuela
La Guerra de los sexos, 2000–2013, Venezuela – host
Viviana a la Medianoche, 1999–2001, Venezuela – host
Confidencias... (Parte 1), 1997–1998, Venezuela
Complicidades, 1988–1991, Venezuela
Gala de la Belleza del Miss Venezuela, 1997–2003 and 2006–2009

See also
List of television presenters

References

External links

fulllatin.com, in Spanish

1965 births
Living people
Venezuelan television actresses
Venezuelan television personalities
Venezuelan people of Brazilian descent
Venezuelan people of Cuban descent
Venezuelan people of Italian descent
Venezuelan beauty pageant winners
Venezuelan expatriates in the Dominican Republic